Long Island is an island in Lake Superior in Wisconsin usually identified with the Apostle Islands. It is geologically different from the other islands, though, in that it is actually just an extension of the spit off Chequamegon Point. It is a part of the Apostle Islands National Lakeshore, and is located in the Town of Sanborn, in Ashland County, Wisconsin.

According to USGS GNIS, there are 5 other islands with the same name in Wisconsin.

Notes

Lake islands of Wisconsin
Islands of Ashland County, Wisconsin
Apostle Islands